Palit Microsystems, Ltd. is a Taiwanese-based company, founded in 1988. It is known for exclusive manufacturing of graphic cards on the basis of Nvidia & ATI graphic chipsets. Palit's factories are found in Mainland, China, while the offices are in Taipei, Taiwan, a logistics center in Hong Kong, China, and branch office in Germany.

Palit Microsystems runs two major brands, Palit, and Gainward, which target different global markets, and other brands like Daytona, Galaxy (GALAX), Vivkoo, Yuan, KFA2 and XpertVision. It also contract-manufactures graphics cards for other companies. In 2013 Palit Microsystems surpassed ASUSTek, becoming the biggest graphics card vendor by volume. Palit Microsystems' monthly maximum capacity reaches 1,200,000 units. As of 2011 Palit's production share was about at 20–25% of world market of graphics solutions. In the same time on the Russian market Palit had more than 40%, in Ukraine – about 30%.

In 2005 Palit Microsystems acquired the Gainward brand, company and branch Gainward Europe GmbH for $1 million of Taiwan-based TNC Industrial.

See also
Gainward

References

Companies based in Taipei
Electronics companies of Taiwan
Graphics hardware companies
Taiwanese companies established in 1988